Dang (ਡਾੰਗ, 鄭, 黨, 唐, 滕) is a Chinese, Vietnamese and Korean surname. It can be found in both Hindus and Sikhs of the Punjab region in the north-western India.

Chinese Dang: 黨 (Tang)
Dang (黨; it also means "party, association") in Cantonese (Dong6 in Jyutping) is transliterated as Dǎng (Deng) in pinyin and Đặng in Vietnamese. origin from
Xia dynasty people, Xia (夏) clan
region name of Shangdang (上党), Changzhi, Jin (Chinese state) people,  branch of Zheng (鄭) clan
Qiang people (Chang people)
Hui people, branch of Cui/Choi clan 
Modern Chinese with new surname

Chinese and Korean Dang: 唐 (Tang)
Dang in Korean is transliterated as Táng in pinyin and Đường in Vietnamese. origin from
Huang Di at Legend Time 26th century BCE, Gongsun (公孫) family 
Qi (祁) family of Yao tribe at 24th century BCE, branch of Liu (劉) clan
Danzhu (丹朱), son of Emperor Yao
Shu Yu of Tang (唐叔虞) in Tang (state), younger brother of King Cheng of Zhou 1042 BC, branch of Zheng (鄭) clan
Qiang people (羌) of Gansu state, branch of Jin (金) clan
People, Dang;
Dang Ye-seo

Chinese and Vietnamese Dang: Deng 鄧 
In Vietnam, the surname is correctly spelled Đặng and it is a popular Vietnamese name unlike in China and Korea. The name Đặng is transliterated as Deng in Chinese and Deung in Korean, all come from the word 鄧. It may originate from:
State of Deng, a small state in Spring and Autumn period in China
The Clan of Man (曼姓), the ruling clan of State of Deng. Later, they used state's name (Deng) as their surname.
Huang Di, branch of Qi (祁) clan

The origin of Vietnamese "Đặng" remains unclear, however it is assumed that the native people of Vietnam had adopted the surname from Chinese literature and history. People with the surname Đặng:

In history
Đặng Dung (鄧容, 1373 - 1414), was the poet and general of the later Tran Dynasty
Đặng Trần Côn (鄧陳琨 c. 1705-1745) was one of the great poets in early modern history of Vietnam
Modern day
Trường Chinh (born Đặng Xuân Khu), Vietnamese communist leader
Đặng Thị Minh Hạnh, Vietnamese fashion designer
Đặng Thị Ngọc Thịnh, Vietnamese politician
Đặng Nhật Minh, Vietnamese film director
Đặng Ngọc Ngự, Vietnamese pilot
Đặng Văn Ngữ, Vietnamese doctor and intellectual.
Đặng Phong, Vietnamese historian, specialized in Vietnam's economic history
Đặng Hữu Phúc, Vietnamese pianist and film score composer
Đặng Thái Sơn, Vietnamese pianist
Đặng Thân, Vietnamese bilingual poet, fiction writer and essayist
Đặng Thùy Trâm, Vietnamese doctor famous for her wartime diaries
Stephanie Murphy (born Đặng Thị Ngọc Dung), American congresswoman

Fuzhounese Dang: 鄭 (Zheng)
Fuzhounese surname from the Fuzhou dialect.

Fictional characters 

 Alexis Thi Dang, a Vietnamese American girl in the Transformers Unicron Trilogy

See also
Deng
Teng
Tang
Dhang

Vietnamese-language surnames
Chinese-language surnames
Korean-language surnames
Multiple Chinese surnames
Indian surnames
Punjabi-language surnames
Surnames of Indian origin
Hindu surnames

vi:Đặng